Keith A. Woodside (born July 29, 1964) is a former professional American football running back in the National Football League (NFL) and Canadian Football League (CFL). He played four seasons for the Green Bay Packers (1988–1991) and then the Winnipeg Blue Bombers in 1994 and Birmingham Barracudas in 1995.

1964 births
Living people
Sportspeople from Natchez, Mississippi
Players of American football from Mississippi
American football running backs
Texas A&M Aggies football players
Birmingham Barracudas players
Green Bay Packers players
Winnipeg Blue Bombers players